Şahmurlu is a village in Silifke district of Mersin Province, Turkey. The population of Şahmurlu is 169 as of 2012. The major economic activity of the village is farming and animal breeding.

References

Villages in Silifke District